The April Revolution, also called the April 19 Revolution or April 19 Movement, were mass protests in South Korea against President Syngman Rhee and the First Republic from April 11 to 26, 1960 which led to Rhee's resignation.

Protests opposing Rhee were started by student and labor groups in the southeastern port city of Masan on April 11. The protests were triggered by the discovery of the body of a local high school student who had been killed by police during demonstrations against rigged elections in March. Popular discontent had arisen due to Rhee's autocratic rule, corruption, use of violence against political opposition, and uneven development of South Korea. The Masan discovery led to large student protests in Seoul, which were violently suppressed; a total of 186 people were killed during the two weeks of protest. Rhee resigned on April 26 before fleeing to exile in the United States, and was replaced by Yun Posun, beginning the transition to the Second Republic of South Korea.

Background

Syngman Rhee had been the first President of South Korea since the 1948 presidential election, overseeing the transition of power from the United States Army Military Government to the Government of South Korea and the establishment of the First Republic of Korea, and led South Korea during the Korean War. With American patronage in the Cold War, Rhee adopted a strongly anti-communist and pro-American stance, and the threat of communism was used as an excuse for severe political repression against any perceived opposition. The South Korean public widely perceived Rhee as corrupt and a dictator who abused his autocratic powers to maintain his rule and cronyism in the government. This was tolerated in the name of political unity and fear of reprisals, but Rhee faced increasing domestic discontent following the end of the Korean War in 1953, as his rule had delivered limited economic and social development, while angering the public by amending the constitution to prolong his stay in power. In December 1958, Rhee forced through the National Assembly an amendment to the National Security Law giving the government broad new powers to curtail freedom of the press and prevent members of the opposition from voting. In 1959, Rhee was shocked and threatened when the United States reduced its economic aid to South Korea from a high of $382,893,000 in 1957 to $222,204,000, and he began taking desperate measures to ensure his political survival.

The March 1960 presidential election saw two main parties running against Rhee: the small Progressive Party (which had received one million votes in the 1956 presidential election) represented by Cho Bong-am, and the Democratic Party represented by Cho Pyong-ok. In July 1959, Rhee accused Cho Bong-am of being a communist, and the Progressive Party leader was subsequently imprisoned and swiftly executed. Cho Pyong-ok went to the United States for a stomach operation at the Walter Reed Army Medical Center but died there of a heart attack. The death of these two competitors seemed too much of a coincidence to the South Korean public and many assumed that both deaths were the result of corruption.

Rhee was determined to see his protege Lee Ki-poong elected as the Vice President, a post chosen in a separate election on the same day. Lee ran against the Democratic Party candidate Chang Myon, who had been South Korea's ambassador to the United States during the Korean War. On March 15, the mostly bedridden Lee won the vice presidential elections with an abnormally wide margin, winning 8,225,000 votes while Myon received just 1,850,000 votes, and it became clear to the people that the vote was fraudulent. According to the Korean Report, Democratic rallies were prohibited throughout the nation and hundreds of pre-marked ballots were stuffed into boxes on election day.

Masan protests and the death of Kim Ju-Yul

On March 15, the same day as the election results, members of the Democratic Party in the southern city of Masan launched a protest against the electoral corruption. About one thousand residents of Masan gathered in front of the Democratic Party's Masan headquarters at around 7:30 in the evening, where the citizens faced off against the police and the city was blacked out. The police started shooting at the people, who responded by throwing rocks at the police.

On April 11, a fisherman in the harbor at Masan discovered the corpse of Kim Ju-yul, a student at Masan Commercial High School who had disappeared during March 15 rioting. Authorities announced that an autopsy confirmed that the cause of Kim's death was drowning, but many rejected this explanation and some protesters forced their way into the hospital where his body was kept. They found that Kim's skull had actually been split by a 20 centimeter-long tear-gas grenade, which had penetrated from his eyes to the back of his head. This indicated that the police had shot the tear gas to an angle less than 45 degrees, which could be fatal if shot directly at a person's face. Rhee's regime tried to censor news of this incident, however the story was reported by the Korean press along with a picture of Kim when his body was first found, and delivered to the world through AP. This incident shocked the nation and became the basis of a national movement against electoral corruption on April 19. Masan erupted into three days of spontaneous mass protests which led to further violent clashes. Rhee tried to shift the focus by claiming that communist agents had been behind the Masan protests.

Seoul protests
On April 18, the protests spread to the capital, Seoul, where students from Korea University launched a non-violent protest at the National Assembly against police violence and demanding new elections, however, they were attacked by gangs funded by Rhee's supporters as they returned to their campus.

On April 19 (called "Bloody Tuesday"), thousands of students marched from various universities to the Blue House, including some high schools, their numbers grew to over 100,000. Arriving at the Blue House, the protesters called for Rhee's resignation. Police opened fire on protestors killing approximately 180 and wounding thousands. That day the Rhee government proclaimed martial law in order to suppress the demonstrations.

On April 25, professors joined students and citizens in large-scale protests outnumbering soldiers and police who refused to attack the protestors.

Resignation of Syngman Rhee
On April 26, 1960, Rhee stepped down from power, and Lee Ki-poong was blamed for most of the corruption in the government. The following day, the Minister of Interior Choi In-Kyu and the Chief of Security resigned taking responsibility for the Masan incident. On April 28, 1960, in an annex of Rhee's mansion, Lee Ki-poong's first son, Lee Kang-seok (1937 – April 28, 1960) shot Lee Ki-poong and his family and then killed himself in a murder-suicide.

Aftermath

After the resignation of Rhee and the death of Lee Ki-poong, the rule of the Liberal Party government came to an end. Rhee was exiled to Hawaii on May 29, 1960, which at first was intended to be a short exile, but he was unable to return because of the opposition of the people. The First Republic was replaced by the Second Republic of South Korea, adopting a parliamentary system to remove power from the office of the president. Yun Bo-seon was elected President on August 13, 1960, but real power was vested in the prime minister, Chang Myon.

A National Assembly investigating committee found that the firing into the crowd by the police had not been intended to disperse the crowds, but rather to kill protesters. It was later revealed at a criminal trial that Park Jong-pyo, the Chief of Public Security who ordered firing against protesters, tied rocks on Kim Ju-yul's dead body and threw him away into the Masan shore to prevent him floating up on the shore. Park was later sentenced to life imprisonment for killing Kim.

On May 16, 1961, following months of political instability, General Park Chung-hee launched a coup d'état overthrowing the short-lived Second Republic of South Korea and replacing it with a military junta and later the autocratic Third Republic of South Korea.

On July 19, 1965, 90-year-old Rhee died at 19:35 Korean time in Honolulu.

See also
History of South Korea
Polish 1970 protests

References

Further reading
Mark Peterson, 2009, A Brief History Of Korea (Brief History), Facts on File.

External links

KBS archive footage of the April protests

1960 in South Korea
20th-century revolutions
South Korean democracy movements
First Republic of Korea
Political history of South Korea
Protests in South Korea
Student protests in South Korea
Second Republic of Korea
April 1960 events in Asia
Conflicts in 1960